Robert B. Jones may refer to:

 Robert Jones (Michigan politician) (1944–2010), politician from the state of Michigan
 Robert B. Jones (linguist) (1920–2007), professor at Cornell University